Whitley Awards may refer to:

 Whitley Awards (Australia)
 Whitley Awards (UK)

See also
 Whitney Awards